Parliamentary elections were held in Egypt in three-stage elections in November and December 2005 to elect 444 of the 454 members of the People's Assembly. The elections formed the Eighth Assembly since the adoption of the 1971 Constitution. Over 7,000 candidates competed in 222 constituencies for the Assembly's 444 elected seats.

They were viewed as yet another test to the current wave of political reform, occurring only 2 months after the first multi-candidate presidential elections. Although the ruling National Democratic Party (NDP) maintained its majority and control of the Assembly, large gains were made by others at the expense of the NDP.

Further importance is attached to these elections as a party must achieve 5% of the seats in the Assembly to field a candidate in the next Egyptian presidential elections in 2011.

Electoral system
The election process ran in the three stages from November 7 to December 9, 2005 using single member plurality, with over 32 million registered voters in the 222 constituencies. Official registration for the candidates began on October 12, 2005.

The role of the police is restricted to maintaining peace and order at the polling stations without interference in the voting process or entering the voting stations.

The first stage was held on Wednesday November 9, with run-off elections on Tuesday November 15 with 10.7 million registered voters covering 8 Egyptian governorates: Cairo, Giza, al-Minufiyah, Bani Suwayf, Asyut, al-Minya, Matruh and al-Wadi al-Jadid

The second stage was held on Sunday November 20, with run-off elections on Saturday November 26 with 10.5 million registered voters covering 9 Egyptian governorates: Alexandria, al-Buhayrah, al-Isma'iliyah, Bur Sa'id, as-Suways, al-Qalyubiyah, al-Gharbiyah, al-Fayyum and Qina.

The third stage was held on December 1, with run-off elections on Wednesday December 7 with 10.6 million registered voters covering 9 Egyptian governorates: ad-Daqahliyah, ash-Sharqiyah, Kafr ash Shaykh, Dimyat, Suhaj, Aswan, al-Bahr al-Ahmar, South Sinai and North Sinai.

Contesting parties
The 2000 legislative election resulted in the following seat distribution in the Seventh Assembly:
 National Democratic Party (NDP) - 417
 New Wafd Party - 6
 Progressive National Unionist Party - 5
 Arab Democratic Nasserist Party - 1
 Liberal Party - 1
 Independents - 14
 Non-Elected Members - 10

Initially the NDP scored only 40% of the seats, but many independents switched their political affiliation back to NDP giving it its soaring majority.

Campaign
Officially, the campaign period starts immediately after the announcement of the final list of candidates and ends one day before election day. In case of run-offs, it restarts the day following the results day to end the day before election day.
Campaign expenditures are limited to not more than £E70,000, with restrictions of any foreign financial assistance or endorsements. Restrictions are also put on using public utilities (transportation, buildings, public sector companies, as well as companies with government-owned shares).

Conduct
The official monitors of the elections are the judiciary and the governmental National Council for Human Rights (NCHR). Over 30 human rights organizations, civil society groups and NGOs pledged to monitor the elections.

The judiciary asked the civil society organizations to form a "National Authority for monitoring elections" that would monitor the elections. Also this authority would replace the wooden ballot boxes with transparent ones (this was done this year), put surveillance cameras inside the polling stations that would provide constant monitoring of the election process (currently under study and is done partially by the media) and to air the vote count live on state television.

Issues
The main concern during the election was not on certain electoral programs or campaigns but rather on how much the oppositions will gain which push for more reform in the future and pave the way for more balance of power in the Egyptian politics. The relevance of this year's elections to the 2011 presidential election gives it even more importance in the Egyptian political arena. Some other issues include the potential amendments promised to the constitution, and the introduction of more laws to political and economic reform.

Results

On 12 December 2005 President Mubarak appointed ten members of the Assembly. Of the appointed, five are men, five are women and four of them are Copts. The appointed members were:
Mohamed Dakrouri, Advisor to the President
Ahmed Omar Hashem, former chairman of Al-Azhar University
Edward Ghali El-Dahabi, lawyer
Ramzi El-Shaer, former president of Zagazig University and professor of constitutional law
Iskandar Ghattas, assistant to the Justice Minister
Zeinab Radwan, former dean of Cairo University's faculty of Arab and Islamic Studies (Became Deputy Speaker)
Georgette Sobhi, member of National Council for Women
Ibrahim Habib, chairman of the Public Notary Authority
Siadah Ilhami, sociologist
Sanaa El-Banna, chairman of the Petrochemical Holding Company

External links
Egyptian Organization for Human Rights Initial Report
Al Ahram File on Parliamentary Elections 2005
Israel and Egypt's elections
The Brotherhood Programme

Egypt
Parliamentary election
Election and referendum articles with incomplete results
Elections in Egypt
Egypt
Egypt